Marc or Mark Edwards may refer to:

Marc Edwards
 Marc Edwards (American football) (born 1974), American football player
 Marc Edwards (professor) (born 1964), professor of civil and environmental engineering
 Marc Edwards (drummer) (born 1949), American jazz drummer
 Marc Edwards (Home and Away), fictional character on the Australian soap opera Home and Away
 Marc Edwards (TV presenter) (born 1980), Welsh television presenter on China Central Television

Mark Edwards
 Mark Edwards (British businessman), British CEO of MDS
 Mark Edwards (harpsichordist) (born 1986), Canadian
 Mark Edwards (boxer) (born 1963), ABA Middleweight Champion
 Mark Edwards (skier), New Zealand Paralympian
 Mark Edwards (British writer), (born 1970), British fiction writer
 Mark Edwards (boatbuilder) (born 1954), English traditional boatbuilder
 Mark Edwards (bishop) (born 1959), Australian Roman Catholic prelate
 Mark Edwards (actor) (born 1942), Australian actor
 My Dad Is Dead, a recording project of musician Mark Edwards

See also
Mark Edward (born 1951), American psychic entertainer and mentalist